is a Japanese anime television series produced by Toei Animation. It is the sequel to Digimon Adventure, and the second anime series in the Digimon franchise. The series aired in Japan from April 2000 to March 2001. It was originally licensed in North America by Saban Entertainment and aired in the US from August 2000 to May 2001 as the second season of Digimon: Digital Monsters in English-speaking territories.

Adventure 02 was followed by the film series Digimon Adventure tri., which was released between 2015 and 2018.

Plot 

Four years after the events of Digimon Adventure, the Digital World is invaded by the Digimon Emperor, who is enslaving Digimon with the Dark Rings while building Control Spires that negate Digivolution. To fight him, three new DigiDestined are recruited, each gaining an ancient Digimon for a partner. The three, along with T.K. and Kari, each possess a D-3, a new type of Digivice that allows them to open a gate to be transported to the Digital World through any computer. They are also given D-Terminals that hold Crest-themed Digi-Eggs that allow their Digimon partners to undergo Armor Digivolution to counter the presence of Control Spires. The Digimon Emperor, revealed to be boy genius Ken Ichijoji, flees to the Digital World. Assisted by Ken's partner, Wormmon, the DigiDestined defeat Ken.

While the DigiDestined rebuild the Digital World, Davis, Yolei, and Cody unlock normal Digivolution. At the same time, they ally themselves with a reformed Ken, who joins the team to fight Arukenimon, a Digimon who revives the Control Spires as other Digimon. When the Control Spire Digimon prove to be stronger than them, the DigiDestined learn DNA Digivolution, which enable two champion-level Digimon to merge into a stronger ultimate-level one. When Arukenimon creates BlackWarGreymon, he begins to destroy each Destiny Stones, hoping to fight Azulongmon, who appears when each Stone is destroyed. After BlackWarGreymon flees, Azulongmon warns the DigiDestined about an impending threat behind Arukenimon and Mummymon.

During Christmas, Control Spires appear across the human world, bringing Digimon with them. While the DigiDestined set off with Imperialdramon to destroy them with the help of the international DigiDestined, Arukenimon and Mummymon begin kidnapping several children for Yukio Oikawa, a friend of Cody's father who dreams of entering the Digital World. Once the DigiDestined return to Japan, they fight the Daemon Corps, and their leader, Daemon, while Oikawa uses the Dark Spore inside Ken to implant them into the children. After Daemon is imprisoned in the Dark Ocean, BlackWarGreymon sacrifices himself to seal the portal to the Digital World at Highton View Terrace, before Oikawa and the kids can transport there.

The DigiDestined are transported to a Dream World with Oikawa and the kids and learn he was controlled by Myotismon. Myotismon splits from Oikawa and uses the energy from the Dark Spores to be reborn as MaloMyotismon. With help from the DigiDestined all over the world, the DigiDestined defeat MaloMyotismon, and Oikawa sacrifices himself to rebuild the Digital World. Twenty five years later, humans and Digimon live together.

Media

Anime 

Digimon Adventure 02 aired with fifty episodes on Fuji TV in Japan between April 2, 2000, and March 25, 2001. The ending themes are performed by AiM, the first half of the show being  and the second half being . "Ashita wa Atashi no Kaze ga Fuku" peaked at #50 on the Oricon Weekly Singles Chart, while "Itsumo Itsudemo" charted at #93. Insert songs featured in the show include "Break up!" by Ayumi Miyazaki as the Armor Digivolution theme and "Beat Hit!" by Miyazaki as the DNA Digivolution theme. The Japanese version was streamed with English subtitles on Crunchyroll in 2008, followed by Funimation Entertainment in April 2009.

Saban Entertainment licensed the show in North America. Its English dub aired on Fox Kids in the US and YTV in Canada between August 19, 2000, and May 19, 2001 as the second season to Digimon: Digital Monsters. Much like the English version of Digimon Adventure, which was dubbed as the first season of Digimon: Digital Monsters, the original soundtrack of the show was replaced by music composed by Udi Harpaz and Shuki Levy, and the opening theme is "Digimon Theme" by Paul Gordon. Other songs featured in the show include "Let's Kick it Up", "Change into Power", and "Hey Digimon", also by Gordon. Jasan Radford also performed songs to the show, including "Run Around", "Going Digital", and "Strange." The songs, including "Digimon Theme", were released on the original soundtrack of Digimon: The Movie.

After the success of season 1 of Digimon: Digital Monsters, the producers requested the writers to add more North American jokes to the script, resulting in several revisions. Eventually, along with the result of Digimon: The Movie, this caused writers Jeff Nimoy and Bob Buchholz to leave the writing team near the end of the series' run. A DVD boxset of the English dub was released in North America by New Video Group on March 26, 2013 and in Australia by Madman Entertainment on July 23, 2014.

Digimon Adventure 02 was streamed by Netflix along with Digimon Adventure from August 3, 2013 to August 1, 2015 in separate English dubbed and Japanese subtitled versions. Crunchyroll acquired streaming rights to the English dubbed versions, while Funimation acquired rights to the English subtitled versions. The English dubbed version of Adventure 02 briefly returned to Netflix while the English subtitled version is now exclusive to Funimation.

Films 

Several short films were screened in Japanese theaters during the show's run. A two-part featurette,  was released on July 8, 2000 as part of Toei Animation Summer 2000 Animation Fair. The film was featured along with Ojamajo Doremi#: The Movie, which was screened in between. In the film, the older DigiDestined are abducted by Wendigomon. The younger DigiDestined investigate their disappearance along with American DigiDestined Willis and his partner, Terriermon, who share a common past with Wendigomon. The film grossed ¥120 billion.

Digimon Adventure 02: Part 1: Digimon Hurricane Landing!!/Part 2: Transcendent Evolution!! The Golden Digimentals was released in North America on October 6, 2000, as the third part of Digimon: The Movie, which included Digimon Adventure (1999) and Digimon Adventure: Our War Game! (2000). The film was heavily altered, one of the cuts including the subplot where the older DigiDestined are kidnapped by Wendigomon, because Saban Entertainment lacked funding to produce a full two-hour movie. Scriptwriter Jeff Nimoy had wanted to release the movie separately as a television film, but the idea was overruled. In addition to Japanese elements being removed and North American jokes added, Willis' backstory was slightly rewritten to include that he had created Diaboromon in order to draw a connection to Digimon Adventure: Our War Game!

 was released on March 3, 2001. The story follows the DigiDestined fighting against a resurrected Diaboromon. The film was released in the United States on August 5, 2005 and was dubbed by Studiopolis and was distributed by Disney through BVS Entertainment and Jetix.

 is currently in production.  The film will be set two years after Digimon Adventure: Last Evolution Kizuna and will introduce the Digidestined to Rui Owada, a boy who falls from Tokyo Tower and who claims to be the first DigiDestined, though he does not have a Digimon with him.

CD dramas 
Various audio dramas were released onto CD in Japan, with the cast reprising their roles from the television series.

The first drama CD,  was released on February 7, 2001 and is centered on the DigiDestined fighting Boltmon, who captures Sora, Mimi, and Kari on Valentine's Day.

Afterwards,  was released on April 4, 2001 and as a single from the Teen-age Wolves and features a drama track where Matt receives a letter from a fan who is about to undergo eye surgery.

The third drama CD,  was released on October 3, 2001 and is centered around Davis visiting Mimi and Willis during summer vacation.

 was released on April 23, 2003 and follows the lives of each DigiDestined after the events of Digimon Adventure 02.

Reception 
Along with Power Rangers, Digimon Adventure 02 was one of the most popular shows on Fox Kids during its run and also contributed to the channel's high ratings, beating out competitors such as ABC, Kids' WB, and Nickelodeon.

Notes

References

External links 
 Toei Animation's Digimon Adventure 02 website
 Fuji TV's Digimon Adventure 02 website
 

2000 anime films
2000 anime television series debuts
2001 Japanese television series endings
2001 anime films
Adventure anime and manga
Animated television series about children
Anime short films
Adventure 02
Fuji TV original programming
Funimation
Japanese children's animated adventure television series
Japanese children's animated science fantasy television series
Older versions of cartoon characters
Science fantasy anime and manga
Sequel television series
Television series about parallel universes
Television series by Saban Entertainment
Television series set in 2002
Toei Animation television